Calidonia is a corregimiento in Soná District, Veraguas Province, Panama with a population of 1,419 as of 2010. Its population as of 1990 was 1,805; its population as of 2000 was 1,427.

References

Corregimientos of Veraguas Province